The Gujarat gecko (Hemidactylus gujaratensis) is a species of gecko. It is endemic to India.

References

Hemidactylus
Reptiles described in 2009
Endemic fauna of India
Reptiles of India